Helena Erbenová (née Balatková, born 6 February 1979) is a Czech cross-country skier and triathlete. She is the winner of the 2012 ITU Winter Triathlon World Championships.

Career

Cross-country skiing
Erbenová has been competing cross-country skiing since 1997. She finished fifth in the 4 × 5 km relay at the 2007 FIS Nordic World Ski Championships in Sapporo and earned her best individual finish of 20th in the sprint at the 2001 championships in Lahti. Erbenová's best Winter Olympic finish was 29th in the 7.5 km + 7.5 km double pursuit at Turin in 2006. She has a total of nine individual victories, all in FIS races, at distances up to the 7.5 km + 7.5 km double pursuit since 2000. Erbenová's best individual World Cup finish was 13th in a 15 km event in Russia in 2007.

Triathlon
Erbenová 2011 XTERRA Triathlon World Championships where she took 3rd place.

The next year, in 2012, Erbenová became the ITU Winter Triathlon World Championship. She also won the European Winter Triathlon champion and the 2012 and European Cross Triathlon champion.

In 2014 Erbenová placed third at the 2014 ITU Cross Triathlon World Championships.

Cross-country skiing results
All results are sourced from the International Ski Federation (FIS).

Olympic Games

World Championships

a.  Cancelled due to extremely cold weather.

World Cup

Season standings

Team podiums

1  podium – (1 )

Personal life
Erbenová is the daughter of Czech skier Helena Balatková-Šikolová. She has two sisters Kateřina and Petra who also were skier. Kateřina's husband is Czech skier Lukáš Bauer.

References

External links
 
 
 page XTERRA Czech

1979 births
Living people
Czech female cross-country skiers
Czech female triathletes
Olympic cross-country skiers of the Czech Republic
Cross-country skiers at the 2002 Winter Olympics
Cross-country skiers at the 2006 Winter Olympics
Sportspeople from Jablonec nad Nisou